Astrid Chevallier is a French visual artist and musician.

Background 

Born in Normandie, France, affichiste (literally meaning "poster designer") Chevallier studied Fine Art in Paris, France, leading her to explore various mediums such as drawing, painting, sculpting, photography, typography, calligraphy, advertising, and graphic design.

She refers to the painters Egon Schiele and Gustav Klimt as her first strong influences.

Graphic Design 

Chevallier started to freelance at advertising agencies as a Graphic Designer and Assistant Photographer before being hired as an Art Director at Euro RSCG, where she learned the ropes of the branding and corporate design business.

In 2002, Chevallier was recruited and relocated to Los Angeles to design film posters for Seiniger Advertising.

Bringing her European influences and her conceptual vision to the table, she has been creating film posters for major Hollywood Studios (Universal Studios, Sony Pictures Entertainment, Warner Bros.), award-winning independent film productions ("I'm Not There", "South of Pico", "Coco Before Chanel", "James Ellroy: American Dog"), TV series ("Camelot (TV series)", "Into the West (TV miniseries)", "Everwood"), and award-winning short films ("Cuco Gomez-Gomez is Dead!", "The Last Full Measure (film)", "Keeper of the Past"). Purple Red’s style stands out by bringing a conceptual or design twist that emphasizes the emotional aspect of the subject matter.

In March 2004, the University of Caen Lower Normandy set up a solo exhibition of more than 40 posters. They produced a video interview of the artist, a CD-Rom, and a catalog and invited Chevallier to speak about her work at a public lecture.

In April 2007, Chevallier was invited to give a lecture about graphic design at The Art Institute of New York City.

On March 10, 2011, the solo exhibition "Affiches" presented 22 of her original posters at the HGCL Gallery in Downtown Los Angeles. The French Embassy relayed and supported the show, and TV5 Monde broadcast an interview with the artist worldwide. Upon the show's extension, Art Critic Ed Fuentes wrote about Chevallier's posters, saying, "They are a visual throwback to the non-tweeting social networking days when posters initiated interest and conversation. (...) Most are delicious examples of how emotional typography mixed with illustrative imagery have not only have a place in film promotion, but in an art gallery."

Painting 
Chevallier has been painting since her fine art school years, and her style slowly transitioned from figurative to abstract. Her work has been displayed in galleries in France, Amsterdam, and Los Angeles, where she has also performed live painting demonstrations.

Music 
Chevallier has studied classical music since she was six, switching later to rock, blues and punk.

In June 2006 she released a solo album, "So Far, My Love", which she wrote, composed, recorded, and produced. The album has been reviewed as "an eclectic collection of fourteen experimental-, ambient- and pop-style tracks (...) The artist's interests emerge in the sound effects of "Bug" and incantations in "Pluie," both highly experimental numbers that will delight some listeners but not others." The main title, "Running Away"(music produced by Peruvian Frágil's lead singer Santino de la Torre; music video by French filmmaker Fanny Jean-Noël), was featured on YouTube while Chevallier was on tour and published videos of live performances online.

Movies 

Chevallier has also been credited as a still photographer on many movie sets.

Her credits include feature films such as Strike One with Danny Trejo, the award-winning South of Pico by Ernst Gossner, and the documentary James Ellroy: American Dog by Kuperberg French filmmakers family.

References

External links 
Astrid Chevallier - official site
Astrid Chevallier Music official YouTube channel

Purple Red - official site

Year of birth missing (living people)
Living people
People from Falaise, Calvados
French graphic designers
Women graphic designers